The  is a railway line operated by Echizen Railway in Fukui Prefecture. The line extends 27.8 km from the city of Fukui to Mikuni-Minato station at Sakai with a total of 22 stations. It was operated by Keifuku Electric Railway until 2001; Echizen Railway took over the line in 2003.

Service
Although the line technically begins at Fukuiguchi Station, all trains run through and terminate at Fukui Station. Trains run twice per hour during the day in order to connect with Hokuriku Main Line limited express trains. During morning peak hours between 7:00 and 9:00, three trains run per hour. There is a single Fukui-bound rapid train each morning, as well as a local "Mezamashi Train" (lit. "wake-up train") departing Mikuni-Minato at 5:16 am every Monday morning that connects with Osaka and Nagoya-bound JR West limited express trains departing from Fukui Station.

All trains run under driver-only operation, but on-board female attendants sell and collect tickets, make station announcements, and assist passengers boarding and alighting. Doors are operated by the driver.

History
Mikuni Awara Electric Railway began operating the line in 1928 between Fukuiguchi Station and Awara Station (now Awara-Yunomachi Station). A year later the line was extended to Mikunichō (now ), and through service began on the Kyōto Dentō Echizen Main Line to Fukui Station. The line became a part of Keifuku Electric Railway in 1942. Two accidents in 2000 and 2001 on the Echizen Main Line forced Keifuku to cease operation on both it and the Mikuni Awara Line in 2001. The line was eventually transferred to Echizen Railway in 2003.

Chronology 
December 30, 1928: Mikuni Awara Electric Railway begins operations between Fukuiguchi — Awara (now ) stations.
January 31, 1929: Awara — Mikunichō (now ) section opens.
February 10, 1929: Mikunichō Station renamed Densha-Mikuni Station.
June 1, 1929: Nakatsuno Station opens.
October 10, 1929: Through operation on the Kyōto Dentō Echizen Main Line to Fukui Station begins.
December 1, 1929: Nishi-Betsuin Station opens.
July 1, 1930: Mikuni-Jinja Station opens.
April 1, 1937: Tawaramachi Station opens.
May 28, 1937: Densha-Mikuni — Tōjinbōguchi section opens.
August 1, 1942: Mikuni Awara Electric Railway merges with Keifuku Electric Railway.
January 11, 1944: Operation halted between Densha-Mikuni — Tōjinbōguchi.
April 20, 1944: Tawaramachi, Yatsushima, Tarōmaru, Mikuni-Jinja Stations closes.
October 11, 1944: Former JNR Mikuni Line electrified; Mikuni — Mikuni-Minato section opens. Densha-Mikuni and JNR Mikuni stations merge.
April 5, 1945: Tarōmaru, Mikuni-Jinja stations reopen.
August 15, 1946: Mikuni-Jinja Station closes.
June 1, 1950: Mikuni-Jinja Station reopen.
November 27, 1950: Tawaramachi Station reopens. Connecting service with Fukui Railway begins.
March 21, 1968: Mikuni — Tōjinbōguchi section abolished.
March 1, 1971: Freight operations end.
March 1, 1972: Awara Station renamed Awara-Yumachi Station.
April 20, 1989: Driver-only operation initiated during non-peak hours.
March 20, 1990: Driver-only operation initiated throughout the day.
September 10, 1992: Jin'ai Ground-Mae Station opens temporarily.
June 25, 2001: Due to accidents on the Echizen Main Line, service halted on the Mikuni Awara Line.
February 1, 2003: Line transferred to Echizen Railway.
July 20, 2003: Fukuiguchi — Nishi-Nagata section operation restarts. Nishi-Fukui Station renamed Fukudaimae-Nishi-Fukui Station; Awara-Yumachi Station renamed Awara-Yunomachi Station.
August 10, 2003: Nishi-Nagata — Mikuni-Minato section operation restarts.
September 1, 2007: Nikkakagakumae, Yatsushima stations open.
September 27, 2015: Matsumoto Machiya station opens.
March 25, 2017: Tarōmaru, Nishi-Harue, Nishi-Nagata and Shimo-Hyōgo stations renamed as Taromaru Angelland, Nishiharue Heartpia, Nishinagata Yurinosato and Shimohyogo Kofuku.

Former connecting lines
 Nishi Nagata Station: The Maruoka Railway opened a 4 km 762 mm gauge line to Shin-Maruoka in 1915. In 1930, it was regauged to 1,067 mm and electrified at 600 V DC in conjunction with the opening of the Eiheiji Line to Shin-Maruoka from Arawa Onsen. The following year, a 3 km electrified line was opened from Shin-Maruoka to Maruoka on the Hokuriku Main Line. The company merged with the Keifuku Railway in 1944, and the entire 7 km line closed in 1968.
 Mikuni  Station - An 8 km line to Arawa Onsen on the Hokuriku Main Line operated between 1911 and 1972.

Rolling stock
Echizen Railway uses twenty-five cars total in its entire railway. The main type active is the MC6101 with twelve cars, followed by MC2101 with eight cars, MC6001 with two cars, and three other types with one car each.

Stations

 All stations are located in Fukui Prefecture.
 Rapid and Express trains: ● - rapid and express and local trains stop, | - rapid trains pass
 Stations marked with an asterisk (*) are staffed.

See also
 List of railway lines in Japan

References
This article incorporates material from the corresponding article in the Japanese Wikipedia

 
Railway lines in Japan
Rail transport in Fukui Prefecture
Railway lines opened in 1928
1067 mm gauge railways in Japan